The Hafslund Line is an abandoned railway line between Hafslund and Sundløkka in Sarpsborg, Norway. The line was a branch line of the Østfold Line and opened in 1898. It was closed in 1973 and was used by Hafslund Smelteverk for industrial transport to its plant and to the port at Sundløkka. The line was electrified at 600 V DC. The 2 km line from the plant to the port was closed in 1967 while the rest of the line closed six years later. One locomotive is preserved at the Krøder Line.

External links
 Jernbane.net on Hafslundbanen

Railway lines in Viken
Railway lines opened in 1898
1898 establishments in Norway